3D – Determination, Dedication, Desire is the second studio album by Starboy Nathan.

Track listing

Chart performance

Release history

References

2012 albums